Jack Standidge (6 May 1907 – 31 March 1958) was a New Zealand cricketer. He played in one first-class match for Wellington in 1940/41.

See also
 List of Wellington representative cricketers

References

External links
 

1907 births
1958 deaths
New Zealand cricketers
Wellington cricketers
Cricketers from Wellington City